Neil Cohen (born September 12, 1955 in Dallas, Texas) is a former U.S. soccer defender.  He played eight seasons in the North American Soccer League and six in the Major Indoor Soccer League.  He also earned one cap with the U.S. national team in 1976. In 2008, Neil was elected to the FC Dallas, "Texans Credit Union Walk of Fame" for his contributions to soccer in Texas.

Player

Youth
Cohen grew up in Dallas, Texas, graduating from Bryan Adams High School in 1973.  He was the first high school All American soccer player from Texas in 1973.

Professional
In 1974, he signed with the Dallas Tornado of the North American Soccer League (NASL).  He played five seasons with the Tornado before moving to the Tulsa Roughnecks in 1979.  He played only three games before moving to the San Jose Earthquakes.  He sat out the 1980 season with injuries, but returned to the Tornado for the 1981 season.  The Tornado folded at the end of the season.  When the Tornado folded in 1981, Cohen was already established in the Major Indoor Soccer League.  In 1979, he signed with the Houston Summit.  The team moved to Baltimore following the 1979–1980 season, changing its name to the Baltimore Blast.  Cohen played one season in Baltimore before moving to the Denver Avalanche for the 1981–1982 season.  When the Avalanche folded, Cohen moved to the St. Louis Steamers for two seasons before signing with the Dallas Sidekicks as a free agent on July 19, 1984.  He injured his knee on December 30, 1984, which put him out for the rest of the season.  He retired on September 24, 1985.  In 1983, Cohen also played for the Dallas Americans of the American Soccer League in 1983 and the United Soccer League in 1984 and 1985.

National team
Cohen began playing with the U.S. junior teams in 1974, taking part in the failed qualification campaign for the 1976 Summer Olympics.  He went on to play for the U.S. at the 1975 Pan American Games.  The U.S. went 0-2 in group play and did not qualify for the second round.
On October 3, 1976, Cohen earned his lone cap with the U.S. national team in a scoreless tie with Mexico in a World Cup qualification game.  He started, then came off for Santiago Formoso in the 80th minute.

Coach
Cohen coached youth soccer in the Dallas area with FC Lynx and Solar. He recently retired in 2006 from youth soccer.

Cohen was the first player to represent his country at all three levels: Youth, Olympic and National Team.  Also at the time in 1973, he was the youngest American player ever signed into the North American Soccer League at the age of 18.

References

External links
 Dallas Sidekicks profile
 1984–1985 Sidekicks media guide

 NASL/MISL stats

1955 births
Living people
Soccer players from Dallas
Bryan Adams High School alumni
American soccer players
Baltimore Blast (1980–1992) players
Dallas Americans players
Denver Avalanche players
Dallas Sidekicks (original MISL) players
Dallas Tornado players
Houston Summit players
Major Indoor Soccer League (1978–1992) players
North American Soccer League (1968–1984) players
North American Soccer League (1968–1984) indoor players
St. Louis Steamers (original MISL) players
San Jose Earthquakes (1974–1988) players
Tulsa Roughnecks (1978–1984) players
United Soccer League (1984–85) players
United States men's international soccer players
Pan American Games competitors for the United States
Footballers at the 1975 Pan American Games
Association football defenders